At the 2004 Summer Olympics, the triathlon events were held at the Vouliagmeni Olympic Centre. Fifty triathletes contested the female event on August 25, and the same number contested the male event on August 26, making up a total of 100 competitors.

Each competitor starts the event with a 1500-metre swim course, followed by a 40 kilometre road bicycle race and finish with a 10 kilometre road run. Both leg transitions (swimming—cycling and cycling—running) are performed on a special transition area, under judge's scrutiny and the duration of the transition is added to the final time.

A pre-Olympic test event was staged over the Olympic course in October 2003, and saw Denmark's Rasmus Henning and Australia's Michellie Jones winning the men's and women's events.

Medalists

Schedule
All times are Greece Standard Time (UTC+2)

Medal table

External links
Official result book – Triathlon

 
Triathlon at the Summer Olympics
2004 Summer Olympics events
O
Triathlon in Greece